The Moorefield Examiner is an American weekly newspaper serving Hardy County, West Virginia. It is owned by R.E. Risher Co. Inc. and has a circulation of 3,818.

History
While claiming antecedents dating back to 1845, the Examiner itself was founded in 1874 by Samuel D. Gordon. It quickly became the leading democratic newspaper in the South Branch Valley, and was in those early years the only newspaper published in Hardy county.

Sam McCoy's son-in-law, Ralph E. Fisher, took over the paper in 1935 after Sam's death, with Sam's wife Eunice as co-publisher. For five years it was run as a co-op while Fisher was on active duty in the Navy. Fisher died of a heart attack, at age 62, in 1968. Since that time the paper has been run by his daughter. Phoebe F. Heishman, her husband David, and their son James. The paper's website claims the newspaper is Hardy County's only locally owned and operated newspaper.

Related Pages
 List of newspapers in West Virginia

Resources

Newspapers published in West Virginia